The 2012 PGA Tour was the 45th season since the Tour became independent from the PGA of America. The season consisted of a total of 45 official money events running from early January to mid November. 

The schedule was announced on October 19, 2011, had four phases:

 Regular season – Consisted of 37 events and started on January 5 with the limited-field Hyundai Tournament of Champions and ended with the Wyndham Championship on August 19.
 FedEx Cup Playoffs – As in previous seasons, this was a series of four tournaments. It started with The Barclays on August 23 and ended with the Tour Championship on September 23.
 Fall Series – After the Tour Championship, the principal portion of the season ended with a series of four tournaments. These tournaments, generally passed on by the elite players, offered an additional opportunity for players to secure their tour cards for the following season by finishing in the top 125 on the money list, or to gain a two-year exemption by winning a tournament with a slightly weaker field than usual.
 Between the regular season and the end of the Fall Series, the tour had three events, none of which offered official prize money.
 The 2012 Ryder Cup, a biennial team competition involving the United States team and the European team. In 2012, this event was held in Illinois.
 The CIMB Classic, a limited-field event held in Malaysia that debuted in 2010.
 The WGC-HSBC Champions, a World Golf Championships event held in China. Founded in 2005, it was elevated to WGC status in 2009, when it also became an event on the PGA Tour schedule. Although the prize money was unofficial, it counted as an official PGA Tour win, if it was won by a PGA Tour member.

The regular season included all four major championships and three of the World Golf Championships events. All four majors and all four WGC events were also sanctioned by the European Tour.

Schedule
The following table lists official events during the 2012 season.

Unofficial events
The following events were sanctioned by the PGA Tour, but did not carry FedEx Cup points or official money, nor were wins official.

Location of tournaments

Money leaders
The money list was based on prize money won during the season, calculated in U.S. dollars.

Awards

Sources:

See also
2012 European Tour
2012 Nationwide Tour
2012 Champions Tour

Notes

References

External links
Schedule on the PGA Tour's official site
2012 PGA Tour at ESPN

PGA Tour seasons
PGA Tour